Currey Road Bridge, officially known as Mahadev Palav Marg, is a stone bridge built in 1915 that connects the neighbourhoods of Parel and Lower Parel in Mumbai, India. The road and bridge see heavy commuter traffic, as they connect Lalbaug and Parel with NM Joshi Marg.

Three sections of the bridge wall had to be removed by the Mumbai Metropolitan Region Development Authority (MMRDA) in 2014 to make room construction of pillars for Line 1 of the Mumbai Monorail.

See also

 Currey Road

References

Roads in Mumbai
Bridges in Maharashtra
1915 establishments in India
Bridges completed in 1915
20th-century architecture in India